The Thomas-Detroit was an automobile manufactured by the E.R. Thomas-Detroit Co of Detroit, Michigan, from 1906-08.  The 1908 version was powered by a 6.1 L 4-cylinder engine with two spark plugs per cylinder.  The drive line consisted of a 3-speed transmission with a drive shaft.  The company later became the Chalmers Motor Company.

See also
Thomas Motor Company

References
 

Defunct motor vehicle manufacturers of the United States
Motor vehicle manufacturers based in Michigan
Defunct manufacturing companies based in Detroit